The 2016 Mountain West Conference women's basketball tournament was a postseason women's which was held on March 7–11, 2016 at the Thomas & Mack Center in Las Vegas, Nevada. Colorado State defeated Fresno State to win their 2nd Mountain West title, 3rd overall for the first time since 2001 and earn an automatic bid to the NCAA women's tournament.

Seeds
Teams are seeded by conference record, with a ties broken by record between the tied teams followed by record against the regular-season champion, if necessary.

Schedule

Bracket

References

2015–16 Mountain West Conference women's basketball season
Mountain West Conference women's basketball tournament